Simonetta Lein (born February 7, 1983) is a TV personality, TV host, model and businesswoman.  Lein has won the Celebrity Media Personality & Influencer of the year 2022 award through the World Influencers Bloggers Award at the Cannes Film Festival. She has modeled for designer Stevie Boi during New York Fashion Week and for Richie Rich at Madison Square Garden.

Career 
During the pandemic, she started "The Simonetta Lein Show" which is now listed as the top short-form celebrity talk show worldwide. She has interviewed celebrities on the show including Steve-O, Mark Cuban, Marcus Lemonis, and Candace Cameron Bure.

She has also written for Forbes, Entrepreneur and Huffington Post USA. She has written a book, Everything Is Possible: A Novel About the Power of Dreams, which was published by Sperling & Kupfer in 2013.

As a model, she has been featured in Vogue Italia, Vanity Fair Italy and Cosmopolitan. Simonetta has modelled for several fashion designers and photographers including Bruno Oliviero and Giovanni Gastel. She is the CEO and co-founder of Ausonia Partners, a media and public relations agency headquartered in Pennsylvania. She has also been cited as one of the top 100 fashion and social media influencers. Lein was also featured on the cover story of Glamour and Chloé Magazine  

In 2017, Lein starred in the pilot of an Influencer Reality Show - Brick & Portal Weekend: NYC Chapter with Anjelika Kour and Heidi Nezarudin.

Lein is a former columnist for Vanity Fair Italy, D di Repubblica, and La Voce Di New York. She has been featured in Vogue Italy, Vanity Fair Italy, Cosmopolitan, and more.

Philanthropy

The Wishwall
In 2015, Lein founded The Wishwall Foundation, an initiative to address social causes like literacy, poverty, women's safety and to help make wishes come true. In 2018, her work at the foundation was extended to a television program called The Wishwall, produced by award winning producer and director Rocco Leo Gaglioti of the FNL Network and is now available worldwide on all smart TVs and Apple iOS and Android apps.The organization has been active in Nigeria. It provided funding for the renovation of the Boripe Community Primary Health Care Center in Osun State, Southwest Nigeria.

References

External links 
 

1983 births
Living people
21st-century Italian women writers
Lein
Italian female models